Old Halesonians Rugby Football Club is an English rugby union team based in Hagley, Worcestershire. The club runs three senior sides, a veterans team, a colts team and junior teams ranging from under 7s to under 17s. The first XV currently plays in Midlands 1 West, a sixth tier league in the English rugby union system, following their relegation from Midlands Premier at the end of the 2017-18 season.

Club honours
North Midlands 2 champions: 1990–91
North Midlands Shield winners: 2006–07
Midlands 4 West (North) champions: 2007–08
Midlands 3 West (North) champions: 2008–09
Midlands Division 1 West champions: 2012–13
North Midlands Cup winners: 2014–15

References

External links
Official club website

English rugby union teams
Rugby clubs established in 1930
Rugby union in Worcestershire